San Baltazar may refer to:

Language
San Baltázar Loxicha Zapotec, a Zapotec language spoken in southern Oaxaca

Places
Mexico
San Baltazar Chichicapam, Oaxaca
San Baltazar Loxicha, Oaxaca
San Baltazar Yatzachi el Bajo, Oaxaca

See also
San Baltasar